Michael Alec Anthony West (born 27 August 1964 in Islington, London, England), better known as Rebel MC and Congo Natty, is a British jungle producer and toaster. He has also gone by aliases including Conquering Lion, Blackstar, Tribe of Issachar, Lion of Judah, X Project and Ras Project.

Biography
In the late 1980s, West formed the group Double Trouble with Michael Menson, Karl Brown (more commonly known as the UK garage DJ Karl 'Tuff Enuff' Brown) and Leigh Guest. This would lead to two hip house records reaching the UK Top 40 in 1989 - "Just Keep Rockin'" followed by "Street Tuff". The latter reached number 3 in the UK Singles Chart. These would appear shortly after on his debut album Rebel Music.

In 1991, West released his second album, Black Meaning Good, which combined his former hip house and pop-rap influences with a stronger reggae and breakbeat edge. The album featured notable reggae and dancehall artists such as Barrington Levy, Tenor Fly and Dennis Brown. Singles released from the album included "The Wickedest Sound", "Comin' On Strong", and "Tribal Base" - to which their breakbeat hardcore and reggae fusion would give rise to an early precursor to the jungle sound.

His third album, Word, Sound and Power, released in 1992, was a further exploration of mixing up breakbeat hardcore, house, reggae and hip hop, with two singles "Rich Ah Getting Richer" and "I Can't Get No Sleep" released from it.

Whilst West was enjoying further commercial success with "Tribal Base" featuring Barrington Levy and Tenor Fly, he was also experimenting with white label releases on his X Project label. The first of these would be "Walking in the Air" (which contains samples from The Snowman track), followed by a further five releases which by this time were jungle.

West is often noted for having popularised the term "jungle". In the book Energy Flash by Simon Reynolds, MC Navigator of Kool FM is quoted as saying: "Rebel got this chant - 'all the junglists' - from a yard-tape" (referring to the sound system tapes from Kingston, Jamaica). "When Rebel sampled that, the people cottoned on, and soon they started to call the music 'jungle'".

In 1994, West converted to Rastafari. As Conquering Lion, he would release a classic jungle track "Code Red", with vocals from Super Cat. This was picked up for major release by Mango Records. This was then followed by the equally massive "Champion DJ" (featuring Top Cat) and "Junglist" (featuring Peter Bouncer), both released on his Congo Natty label that would be prolific in the mid-1990s to early 2000s.

In 2013, West returned with the album Jungle Revolution, featuring the likes of General Levy, Top Cat, Tippa Irie, Tenor Fly, and Nanci Correia.

Discography

Albums

Compilations
 Most Wanted (Congo Natty, 2008)

Singles

As Rebel MC

As X Project, Lion of Judah et al
 "Walking in the Air" (X Project, 1992)
 "The Calling"/"Jah Sunshine" (X Project, 1993)
 "Inahsound"/"Lion of Judah" (X Project, 1993)
 "Code Red" (as Conquering Lion) (X Project/Mango, 1994)
 "Champion DJ" (as Blackstar with Top Cat) (Congo Natty, 1994)
 "Junglist" (as Tribe of Issachar) (Congo Natty, 1995)
 "Jah Set It" (as Lion of Judah) (Congo Natty, 1996)
 "Emperor Sellasie I" (as Lion of Judah) (Congo Natty, 1997)

References

External links
 Official website
 Rebel MC at Discogs.com
 Congo Natty at Discogs.com
 Rebel MC at Heroes of Hip-Hop

1964 births
Living people
English drum and bass musicians
English male singers
Black British male rappers
English record producers
Hip house musicians
Singers from London
People from Islington (district)
Rappers from London
Big Dada artists
Ninja Tune artists